Jared James Mitchell (born 1955) is a Canadian journalist and fiction author, currently based in Toronto, Ontario. Besides his books, he has written for numerous newspapers and magazines such as Maclean's and The Globe and Mail. He also established the fotonovella.com website for his media fiction works which are termed "photonovellas".

Bibliography
 The Invincible. Toronto: Lester, 1995. 
 Becky Chan. Toronto: Dundurn, 2001. 
 The Bad Guys. Kindle, 2011. 
 Mayhem. Wattpad, 2015.

External links
 fotonovella.com
 Cooke Agency: The Jet Age, accessed 13 July 2006, accessed 13 July 2006

1955 births
Living people
Canadian male novelists
Canadian gay writers
Journalists from Toronto
Canadian LGBT novelists
Writers from Toronto
Canadian male non-fiction writers
Gay novelists